RIP 202D (route d’intérêt provincial 202D) is a secondary road in Sava Region, Madagascar.

See also
List of roads in Madagascar
Transport in Madagascar

References

Roads in Sava
Roads in Madagascar